Omkoi is the southwesternmost district (amphoe) of Chiang Mai province in northern Thailand.

Geography
Neighboring districts are (from the north clockwise) Hot and Doi Tao of Chiang Mai Province, Sam Ngao, Mae Ramat, and Tha Song Yang of Tak province and Sop Moei of Mae Hong Son province. The Thanon Thongchai Range dominates the landscape.

History
The minor district (king amphoe) was established on 19 April 1929 as a subordinate of Hot district, consisting of the three sub-districts Omkoi, Yang Piang, and Mae Tuen. It was upgraded to a full district on 23 July 1958.

Administration
The district is divided into six sub-districts (tambon), which are further subdivided into 95 villages (muban). Omkoi is a sub-district municipality (thesaban tambon) which covers parts of the tambon Omkoi. There are further six tambon administrative organizations (TAO).

Gallery

References

External links
amphoe.com (Thai)

Omkoi